Hendrik Jan ("Henk-Jan") Held (born 12 November 1967 in Renswoude, Utrecht) is a volleyball player from the Netherlands, who represented his native country in two consecutive Summer Olympics, starting in 1992 in Barcelona, Spain.

After having won the silver medal in 1992, Held's finest hour came in 1996, when he won the gold medal in Atlanta, United States with the Dutch Men's National Team by defeating Italy in the final (3-2). Held played professionally volleyball in Italy for several years.

References
  Dutch Olympic Committee

1967 births
Living people
Dutch men's volleyball players
Olympiacos S.C. players
Olympic gold medalists for the Netherlands
Olympic medalists in volleyball
Olympic silver medalists for the Netherlands
Olympic volleyball players of the Netherlands
People from Renswoude
Volleyball players at the 1992 Summer Olympics
Volleyball players at the 1996 Summer Olympics
Medalists at the 1996 Summer Olympics
Medalists at the 1992 Summer Olympics
Sportspeople from Utrecht (province)
20th-century Dutch people